Freya Christine Clausen also known as Freya (born 17 November 1978) is a Danish singer/songwriter and television personality, based in Copenhagen. She worked as an MTV VJ, then moved to VH1 in 2010. She has released two solo albums, Tea with the Queen and Chasing My Tale.

Since 2010 she has hosted the pan-Scandinavian TV channel Star!'s broadcasts from Stockholm Fashion Week by Berns.

Freya released a new single called "Into The Fire" on 29 September 2014.

References 

1978 births
Living people
Danish television personalities
English-language singers from Denmark
21st-century Danish  women singers
People from Tønder Municipality